Soul Yogi is the sixth album by American jazz vibraphonist Freddie McCoy which was recorded in 1968 for the Prestige label.

Reception

Allmusic rated the album 2 stars.

Track listing
All compositions by Freddie McCoy except where noted.
 "Soul Yogi" – 3:35   
 "Salem Soul Song" – 5:30   
 "Sorry 'Bout That  3:40   
 "I Am the Walrus" (John Lennon, Paul McCartney) – 3:35   
 "Pet Sounds" (Brian Wilson) – 2:30   
 "What Now My Love" (Gilbert Bécaud, Pierre Delanoë, Carl Sigman) – 4:50   
 "Mysterioso" (Thelonious Monk) – 5:30   
 "Ride On" – 3:25   
 "Autumn Leaves" (Joseph Kosma, Jacques Prévert, Johnny Mercer) – 5:00  
Recorded at Van Gelder Studio in Englewood Cliffs, New Jersey on January 24 (tracks 2-5 & 8) and  February 5 (tracks 1, 6, 7 & 9)

Personnel 
Freddie McCoy – vibraphone, drums 
JoAnne Brackeen – piano, organ
Steve Wolfe – sitar (tracks 2-5 & 8)
Wally Richardson – guitar (tracks 2-5 & 8)
Lawrence Evans – electric bass
Ray Appleton – drums
Dave Blume – arranger, conductor 
Peter Dimitriades, Emanuel Green, Joseph Malignaggi – violin (tracks 1-5 & 8)

References 

1968 albums
Freddie McCoy albums
Prestige Records albums
Albums recorded at Van Gelder Studio
Albums produced by Cal Lampley